Che Keng Tuk is a village in the Hebe Haven area of Sai Kung District, Hong Kong.

Administration
Che Keng Tuk is a recognized village under the New Territories Small House Policy.

References

External links
 Delineation of area of existing village Che Keng Tuk (Sai Kung) for election of resident representative (2019 to 2022)

Sai Kung District

Villages in Sai Kung District, Hong Kong